Richard Webb (born 15 September 1952) is a former cricketer who played in three One Day Internationals (ODIs)for the New Zealand cricket team in 1983, principally as a fast-medium bowler. He played 25 matches of domestic first-class cricket for Otago from 1975/76 to 1983/84.

His older brother, Murray Webb, also a pace bowler for Otago, played in three Tests for New Zealand from 1971 to 1974.

International career
Webb's first ODI was the second match in the best-of-three final of the Benson & Hedges World Series Cup against Australia, played on 13 February 1983 at the Melbourne Cricket Ground (MCG). Australia won the toss and batted first. Webb opened the bowling, taking 2–47 in his 9 overs, as Australia scored 302. Webb batted at #11, scoring 6 not out, as New Zealand were bowled out for 153, losing the match by 149 runs, and the series final 2–0.

Webb also played in the 1st and 2nd ODIs against England in 1983. In the 1st ODI, played at Eden Park on 19 February 1983, England won the toss and batted first. Again, Webb opened the bowled, taking 0/30 in his 10 overs. England were dismissed for only 184. New Zealand reached their target comfortably, winning by 6 wickets, so Webb did not bat.

In the 2nd ODI, England again won the toss, but put New Zealand in to bat first. New Zealand reached 295–6, so again Wedd did not bat. In his third and final ODI, he bowled at first change, taking 2–28 in 7.5 overs. He took the final wicket, bowling Derek Pringle for 11, reducing England to 192 all out, so New Zealand won by 103 runs.

External links

1952 births
Living people
New Zealand cricketers
New Zealand One Day International cricketers
Otago cricketers